Rogers Media Inc., operating as Rogers Sports & Media, is a Canadian subsidiary of Rogers Communications that owns the company's mass media and sports properties, such as the Citytv and Omni Television terrestrial television stations, Sportsnet, OLN, localized versions of FX and FXX, the Rogers Radio stations, Frequency Podcast Network, and these properties' associated digital media outlets.

The company previously owned a number of magazines under the Rogers Publishing banner, including the former Maclean-Hunter magazines (such as namesake Maclean's). In 2019, Rogers completed its divestment of the unit's remaining properties to St. Joseph Communications.

Operations

Current television brands owned by Rogers include the English-language Citytv and multicultural Omni television systems, and the Sportsnet family of channels, which began as a group of regional sport channels and now serves as the de facto sports programming brand and division for Rogers. Through Sportsnet, Rogers also distributes the linear version of WWE Network; as part of a larger program rights agreement with WWE, in which Sportsnet 360 carries WWE's main programming. Other television brands include TSC, and Canadian versions of FX, FXX, and OLN.

The Rogers Radio unit owns 55 stations across Canada.

History 

Rogers Media was established in 1960 when Ted Rogers and Joel Aldred acquired CHFI. The origins of Rogers can be traced to 1925 when Edward S. Rogers Sr. launched a radio station that would eventually become CFRB. In August of 1925, the name Roger's came into view on the Canadian broadcasting scene with the introduction of the Rogers Batteryless Radio at the Canadian National Exhibition in Toronto. This invention was made with new tubed by Edward S Ted Rogers, who invented them. Edward's father funded Albert's holding company Standard Radio Manufacturing Corporation Ltd. Standard this development. During the year 1927, the first ever seen radio broadcasting transmitter was built by Edward Rogers. This was a big deal because it operated from power lines without the assistance of batteries or converters. Rogers Batteryless was born from this invention.  

In 1939, Edward Rogers died, and his son was only six years old. The Roger family had involvement in Canada's broadcasting until about the mid-1940s; Velma, Edwards's wife, sold her shares away in Standard Radio Limited. Sixteen years later, the business would resurface again due to the son of Edward Rogers, Ted. 

The business of Roger's Sports and Media began in 1960 when Ted borrowed an 85,000 dollar loan to buy Canada's FM radio station, CHFI. That year, Rogers and Aldred formed Baton Aldred Rogers Broadcasting (a forerunner to present-day competitor Bell Media) when it acquired the license for CFTO-DT, which launched the following year. In 1962, Rogers bought Aldred's shares of CHFI, which changed its name to CHFI-FM Limited, then Rogers Broadcasting Ltd. By 1964, CFTR went on air.

In 1986, Rogers acquired CFMT, Canada's first multicultural station. It also received many stations from Selkirk Communications in 1989.

In the most significant acquisition to date, Rogers Media acquired the assets of Maclean Hunter broadcasting properties in 1994 though it resold various properties to Western International Communications.

In 2000, Bell GlobeMedia acquired NetStar, the parent company of TSN, which ultimately divested the stake of Sportsnet

In June 2007, as part of CTVglobemedia's acquisition of CHUM Limited, Rogers announced its intent to acquire its Citytv stations. CTV had originally intended initially intended to sell CHUM's A-Channel stations and several other specialty channels to Rogers. Still, the CRTC required the Citytv stations to be divested to comply with major-market ownership restrictions. CTV maintained ownership of flagship Toronto station CITY-TV's local news channel CP24, prompting Rogers to establish its own short-lived CityNews Channel in 2011 as a substitute, in cooperation with CITY-TV and sister news radio station 680 CFTR. The network folded in 2013.

On January 16, 2008, the CRTC rejected an application by Rogers to establish a new rock radio station in Parry Sound, citing that it would have a disproportionately negative impact on its North Bay stations and local competitor CKLP-FM/.

Rogers acquired a minority interest in the web-based video production firm Vuguru in 2009.  In 2010, Rogers received CHST-FM in London, Ontario, from CTVglobemedia.

On August 25, 2012, Rogers Media acquired Score Media's broadcast business (including The Score Television Network) for $167 million, including a 10% stake in its digital business. The channel has since been rebranded to Sportsnet 360.

On November 26, 2013, Rogers announced that it would become the exclusive national media rightsholder for the National Hockey League beginning in the 2014–15 season under a 12-year contract valued at $5.2 billion. This gave Rogers rights to broadcast national telecasts on the Sportsnet networks and CBC Television (the latter as part of a sub-licensing agreement to maintain Hockey Night in Canada) and handle distribution for the NHL's out-of-market packages.

In October 2014, Rogers announced a $100 million joint venture with Vice Media to establish a production studio in Toronto  and launch Vice-branded television and digital properties in 2015.  On November 5, 2015, Rogers and Vice announced that it would launch Vice's upcoming specialty channel Viceland in Canada on February 29, 2016, replacing the existing Biography Channel Canada.

In September 2016, Rogers acquired Tillsonburg Broadcasting Company's CJDL-FM and CKOT-FM in Tillsonburg. In January 2018, Rogers announced its acquisition of CJCY-FM in Medicine Hat, Alberta, from Clear Sky Radio.

After Rogers pulled out of its venture with Vice, Viceland shut down on March 31, 2018. In March 2019, Rogers announced that it would sell its remaining print publications, including Maclean's, Chatelaine, and Hello! Canada, Today's Parent, and the digital operations of former magazines Canadian Business and Flare to St. Joseph Communications.

In February 2020, Rogers Media was rebranded as Rogers Sports & Media to "more accurately [reflect] our mix of assets." However, the subsidiary's legal name did not change.

See also
Rogers Radio
Bell Media
WildBrain
Corus Entertainment

References

External links

History of Rogers Media - Broadcasting - Canadian Communications Foundation

Rogers Communications
Canadian brands
Radio broadcasting companies of Canada
Television broadcasting companies of Canada
Magazine publishing companies of Canada
Mass media companies established in 1960
Publishing companies established in 1960
Canadian companies established in 1960